Anthony Head (born 1954) is an English actor.

Anthony or Tony Head may also refer to:

Antony Head, 1st Viscount Head (1906–1983), British soldier, Conservative politician and diplomat
Tony Head (athlete), Australian Paralympic athlete
Tony Head (motorcyclist), competitor in the 1983 Grand Prix motorcycle racing season

See also
 Anthony Heald